Combaya Municipality is the fifth municipal section of the Larecaja Province in the  La Paz Department, Bolivia. Its seat is Combaya.

Languages 
The languages spoken in the Combaya Municipality are mainly Aymara and Spanish.  

Ref.: obd.descentralizacion.gov.bo

References 
 www.ine.gob.bo / census 2001: Combaya Municipality

External links 
 Old map of Larecaja Province (showing its previous political division)

Municipalities of La Paz Department (Bolivia)